Jannich Victor Bøgelund Storch (born 12 May 1993) is a Danish footballer who plays as a goalkeeper for Lyngby Boldklub in the Danish Superliga. Storch has amassed 3 youth caps for Denmark, playing for the Danish under-16s.

Club career

Early years
Jannich Storch began his youth career at his hometown club of Helsinge Fodbold, where he was later picked up by Superliga team F.C. Nordsjælland in February 2009.

In the summer of 2009, Storch attracted the attention of Blackburn Rovers during a Danish under-16 match in Portugal, whom he would go on trial with. He was later offered a contract by the English club after an impressive match for the youth team, making 12 saves and a penalty kick, but decided against signing with the Premier League team saying it was too early for him to leave Denmark.

Nordsjælland
Storch was included in the first team squad for FCN's 2011-12 Superliga season, as third choice goalkeeper behind Jesper Hansen and David Jensen. 2 October 2011, Storch made his league debut, coming on as a half time substitute in a 1-0 win over SønderjyskE.

Nykøbing FC
On 7 January 2019, Nykøbing FC announced the signing of Storch.

Lyngby Boldklub
On 23 January 2023, Storch signed for Lyngby Boldklub on an eighteen-month contract, combining his playing role with a goalkeeper coaching role in the academy.

Coaching career
In May 2018, Storch founded the company JS Keepers, which offered goalkeeping training to both clubs and individuals.

In October 2020, Storch was hired as a youth goalkeeper coach at RB Køge. Storch was later also a part of the coaching team at the academy of Brøndby IF.

Career statistics

Club

References

External links 
 Profile at DBU.dk 

1993 births
Living people
Danish men's footballers
FC Nordsjælland players
FC Roskilde players
Nykøbing FC players
Lyngby Boldklub players
Danish Superliga players
Danish 1st Division players
Association football goalkeepers
People from Gribskov Municipality
Sportspeople from the Capital Region of Denmark